Dorcadion mystacinum is a species of beetles in the family Cerambycidae. It was described by Ballion in 1878. It is known from Kazakhstan and nanistan.

Subspecies
 Dorcadion mystacinum mystacinum Ballion, 1878
 Dorcadion mystacinum pumilio Plavilstshikov, 1951
 Dorcadion mystacinum rufidens Jakovlev, 1906

See also 
 Dorcadion

References

mystacinum
Beetles described in 1878